Ivan Dimitrov Karayotov is a Bulgarian archaeologist and historian who studied ancient and medieval archaeology and history.

Since 1972 he has worked at the Regional Museum of Burgas.

Bibliography (Monographs) 
 Монетосеченето на Месамбрия. Burgas 1992.
 The coinage of Mesambria.
 Vol. 1: Silver and gold coins of Mesambria.  Centre of Underwater Archaeology, Sozopol 1994.
 Vol. 2: Bronze coins of Mesambria. Centre for Maritime and Regional Studies, Sozopol 2009. .
 Водите на Хемус и Странджа. Burgas 2004
 Остров “Света Анастасия”. Burgas 2004

Literature
  Иван Карайотов в Кой кой е в елита на Бургас и региона : [Биографичен справочник] / Състав. Пеньо Костадинов, Стойчо Кьосев. - Бургас, 1996/1997, p. 85-86.
  Иван Карайотов в Кой кой е в българската култура : [Справочник] / Състав. Пенка Добрева, Таня Войникова, Стефка Георгиева. - Варна : Славена, 1998, p. 243.
  Илия Зайков Археология : Стихотворение, Изв. Нар. музей - Бургас, 4, 2002
 Studia in honorem Ivani Karayotov.  Burgas 2002

1941 births
People from Burgas
20th-century Bulgarian historians
Bulgarian archaeologists
Living people
21st-century Bulgarian historians